Buyu, or Buyi, is a Bantu language of Lake Tanganyika that is closely related to Nyanga.

Former ISO coding problems
A "Bemba" language of South Kivu was listed in Ethnologue 17 as ISO code [bmy]. However, the name, Kinyabemba, is the language of the Banyabemba, one of the tribes that speak Buyu. (It is not the Bemba language of Zambia.) "Songa" [sgo] is another Buyu-speaking tribe rather than a distinct language.  "Buya" [byy] is unidentified, but may be a typo for Buyu.  The codes were retired in 2014.

References

Nyanga-Buyi languages
Languages of the Democratic Republic of the Congo
Spurious languages